María Fernanda del Carmen Morales Ponce de León (born November 7, 1970, in Mexico City) is a Mexican voice actress. Morales is most known for the voice of Saori Kido in Saint Seiya, Chip in Chip 'n Dale Rescue Rangers, Kimi Finster in Rugrats and All Grown Up!, and Sailor Venus in Sailor Moon among other works she has worked on.

Roles

Television animation
 All Grown Up! (Kimi Finster (Dionne Quan)
 Captain N: The Game Master (Princess Lana (Venus Terzo)
 Chip 'n Dale Rescue Rangers (Chip (Tress MacNeille)
 Corrector Yui (Yui Kasuga (Makiko Ōmoto)
 Talespin (Molly Cunningham (Janna Michaels), Princess Lotta L'Amour (Kath Soucie))
 DuckTales (Hugo, Paco and Luis (Russi Taylor)
 Ed, Edd y Eddy (Johnny (second voice) (David Paul Grove)
 Rugrats (Kimi Finster (Dionne Quan)
 Pokémon (Flannery) (Rio Natsuki)
 Sailor Moon (Sailor Venus (Rika Fukami)
Sailor Moon Crystal (Sailor Venus (Shizuka Itō)
Saint Seiya (Athena (Saint Seiya) (Keiko Han, Fumiko Orikasa)
 Zatch Bell! (Kido, Li-en))
 Invader Zim (Tak)
 Kitty Is Not a Cat (Thorn)

OVA
 Baby Einstein (Narrator for videos)
 Cartoon All-Stars to the Rescue (Hugo, Paco and Luis (Russi Taylor)
 FernGully: The Last Rainforest (Crysta (Samantha Mathis))
 FernGully 2: The Magical Rescue (Crysta (Laura Elrich))
 The Lion King 1½ (Adult Nala (Moira Kelly))
 The Lion King II: Simba's Pride (Nala (Moira Kelly))
 Once Upon a Forest (Abigail) (Ellen Blain)
 The Iron Giant (Annie Hughes) (Jennifer Aniston)
 Mickey's Magical Christmas: Snowed in at the House of Mouse (Chip and Hugo, Paco and Luis (Tress MacNeille and Tony Anselmo).

Theatrical animation
 Kiki's Delivery Service (Ursula (Minami Takayama))
 Rock-a-Doodle (Peepers (Sandy Duncan))
 The Lion King (Adult Nala (Moira Kelly))
 A Goofy Movie (Stacey (Jenna von Oy))
 Los Caballeros del Zodíaco: La Película (Athena)
 Space Jam (Lola Bunny (Kath Soucie))
 Final Fantasy: The Spirits Within (Aki Ross (Ming-Na))
 The Road to El Dorado (Chel (Rosie Perez))

Live action
Spider-Man 2 (Ursula Ditkovich (Mageina Tovah))
Spider-Man 3 (Ursula Ditkovitch (Mageina Tovah))

External links
 
 
 

Living people
Mexican voice actresses
1970 births
Place of birth missing (living people)
20th-century Mexican actresses
21st-century Mexican actresses